Victor Davis (2 November 1902 – 2 September 1981) was an Australian rules footballer who played with Carlton in the Victorian Football League (VFL).

Notes

External links 

Victor Davis's profile at Blueseum

1902 births
1981 deaths
Carlton Football Club players
Australian rules footballers from Bendigo